Pepper J. Keenan (born May 8, 1967) is an American guitarist and vocalist, best known for his work with heavy metal bands Corrosion of Conformity and Down. He joined Corrosion of Conformity in 1989, but did not become the lead singer until the recording of Deliverance in 1994. In 1991, Keenan formed Down with Phil Anselmo of Pantera, Jimmy Bower of Eyehategod, and Kirk Windstein and Todd Strange of Crowbar.

Early life

Keenan was born in Oxford, Mississippi, but now lives in New Orleans, Louisiana, where he owns a bar named "Le Bon Temps Roule". His father, a former musician, is a local real estate appraiser in New Orleans. While developing his playing style in New Orleans, Pepper served as a member of local band Graveyard Rodeo, and met and became friends with Corrosion of Conformity during their frequent shows at the infamous Franklin Avenue VFW Hall in New Orleans.

Career

Corrosion of Conformity

Keenan joined Corrosion of Conformity in 1989. Corrosion of Conformity released their third album, Blind, with Keenan on rhythm guitar. After Karl Agell and Phil Swisher left the band (Swisher being replaced by original bassist Mike Dean), Keenan took over on vocals and guitar. Corrosion of Conformity have since released the albums Deliverance, Wiseblood, America's Volume Dealer, and In the Arms of God, No Cross No Crown, as well as the live release Live Volume. 

From 2006 to 2010, Corrosion of Conformity was on hiatus. The band later reunited and recorded two albums without Keenan, however, he rejoined the group in 2015 and they performed their first show with the reunited Deliverance-era lineup of Keenan, Woody Weatherman, Mike Dean, and Reed Mullin in March 2015 in Manchester, England. Their first U.S. tour with the reunited lineup, supporting Clutch, was announced in July 2015. No Cross No Crown, the bands latest album to date, was released in 2018 and features Keenan on vocals and guitar.

Down

Keenan was a founding member of Down in 1991 along with Pantera's Phil Anselmo, Eyehategod's Jimmy Bower, and Crowbar's Kirk Windstein and Todd Strange. In 1995, Down released their debut album, NOLA. The band went on indefinite hiatus in 1996 but returned three years later with Pantera bassist Rex Brown replacing Strange. In 2002, Down released their second album Down II: A Bustle in Your Hedgerow. Following a second hiatus, Down released their third album entitled Down III: Over the Under in 2007. Down released their fourth album Down IV Part I – The Purple EP in September 2012 and Down IV – Part II of a four-part series of EPs.

Collaborations with Metallica
Keenan plays guitar and sings a part of the second verse on Metallica's cover of the Lynyrd Skynyrd song "Tuesday's Gone". He also recorded a number of other songs in the same session, but this was the only one given a general release (on the album Garage Inc.), the others only being available as bootlegs. Keenan is good friends with lead singer and guitarist James Hetfield. Hetfield provided backing vocals on "Man or Ash" from Corrosion of Conformity's Wiseblood. Keenan auditioned for Metallica's vacant bass player position following Jason Newsted's departure from the band but lost out to former Suicidal Tendencies/Ozzy Osbourne bassist Robert Trujillo. Keenan's audition is shown in the Metallica documentary Metallica: Some Kind of Monster.  In addition to his contribution to the song "Tuesday's Gone" Pepper also appeared with Metallica onstage at the Download Festival in Donington, England in 2006 along with Matt Heafy of Trivium to provide additional vocals on the song "Die, Die My Darling" (a Misfits cover). This song was played at the end of Metallica's headlining set.

Personal life
Keenan became the father of a daughter named Flannery Rose Keenan with his longtime girlfriend Anna Hrnjak on January 5, 2010.

In an interview with Guitar.com, Keenan was asked about his thoughts on politics in which he responded "I mean, the Bible means a lot more to me than the Constitution and any fuckin' politics involved in this country or any other country."

Keenan has been a vocal critic of Donald Trump. At a 2016 Corrosion of Conformity concert, Keenan dedicated the song "Vote with a Bullet" to the former US president.

Keenan was featured with his 1955 Chevy "Gasser" in a television episode of Big Easy Motors.

Discography

Corrosion of Conformity albums

Down albums

References

External links

Corrosion of Conformity official website
Gallery of Pepper Keenan with Corrosion of Conformity on Alberta Stars
Interview with Pepper on the Down tour
Backstage audio interview with Pepper Keenan on 3RRR FM

1967 births
Living people
People from Oxford, Mississippi
American heavy metal guitarists
American male singers
American heavy metal singers
Musicians from New Orleans
Rhythm guitarists
Down (band) members
Guitarists from Louisiana
20th-century American guitarists
Corrosion of Conformity members
American male guitarists